Continuum is an album by Swiss pianist and composer Nik Bärtsch's Mobile recorded in Switzerland in 2015 and released on the ECM label.

Reception

The AllMusic review by Thom Jurek states "Continuum is European jazz rife with funkiness; it's just more specific sound. It may require a closer listen, at least initially, but once experienced, its depth and constancy are unmistakable". They also selected it as one of their Favorite Jazz Albums of 2016.

PopMatters' John Garratt said "While their playing can be every bit as spritely as Ronin, Continuum captures Mobile in a low, pensive light. This isn’t to say that the music isn’t as successful overall, it’s just that establishing a warm sense of intimacy with it is going to take a little work on your part".

All About Jazz reviewers said, "With its variety of styles, Continuum is the best of Mobile's albums to date, despite the very high bar set from the beginning" and "there's little doubt that those who've become fans of Ronin's more eminently groove-laden music will be (if they weren't already) ready for this group's richer compositional rigor...for whom the term Continuum is, indeed, wholly appropriate for its broader-spectrum'd musical treasures".

London Jazz News' John L. Walters noted "Bärtsch's music is always urgent but never in a hurry, and his sidemen follow the leader’s calm self-discipline. What improvisation there is takes place within the broad structures of the compositions – Mobile may not be a ‘blowing’ band in the jazz sense of the word, but it interprets the music as if it were".

In JazzTimes, Steve Greenlee wrote "There is a clean, icy quality to this music—a hallmark of Scandinavian jazz—that invites comparisons to electronica and to the work of Philip Glass and film composer Thomas Newman... Continuum, beginning to end, is mesmerizing".

Track listing
All compositions by Nik Bärtsch.

 "Modul 29_14" - 8:59
 "Modul 12" - 9:02
 "Modul 18" - 8:03
 "Modul 5" - 8:32
 "Modul 60" - 9:27
 "Modul 4" - 5:26
 "Modul 44" - 10:23
 "Modul 8_11" - 8:32

Personnel
 Nik Bärtsch — piano
 Sha - bass clarinet, contrabass clarinet
 Kaspar Rast, Nicolas Stocker - drums, percussion
Etienne Abelin, Ola Sendecki - violin
David Schnee - viola
Ambrosius Huber, Solme Hong - cello

References

2016 albums
Nik Bärtsch albums
ECM Records albums
Albums produced by Manfred Eicher